Toxorhynchites rutilus, known generally as the elephant mosquito or treehole predatory mosquito, is a species of mosquito in the family Culicidae. They are generalist predators, with common prey being microcrustaceans, rotifers, and other hexapods.

Subspecies
These two subspecies belong to the species Toxorhynchites rutilus:
 Toxorhynchites rutilus rutilus
 Toxorhynchites rutilus septentrionalis

References

External links

 

rutilus
Articles created by Qbugbot
Insects described in 1896